EDV or Edv may refer to:
 End-diastolic volume, the volume of blood in the right or left ventricle at end of filling in diastole
 Rivian EDV, a battery-electric cargo vehicle built by Rivian
 EDV Virus, a computer virus
 EDV engine, a Chrysler engine
 Edv. or Edvard
 Jens Edv. Haugland, a Norwegian politician
 Edv. Sørensen, a Danish politician